Volei Municipal Zalău, commonly known as VM Zalău, is a professional volleyball club based in Zalău, Romania.

Honours 
Divizia A1:
Winners: 1997, 1998, 1999, 2000, 2010, 2011, 2012, 2017
Runners-up: 2019

Cupa României:     
Winners: 2012, 2015, 2016

Previous names
–2003: Elcond Zalău
2003–2017: Club Sportiv Remat Zalău 
2017–Present: Volei Municipal Zalău

Team

Current squad
Squad for the 2018-19 season     
  Cristian Bartha 
  Filip Constantin
  Andrei Spînu 
  Ciprian Matei   
  Răzvan Mihalcea
  Mihai Gheorghiţă
  Paul Şomoi 
  Rareş Bălean
  Miroslav Gradinarov
  Jani Jeliazkov 
  Philipp Kroiss 
  Leonardo João Dal Bosco Dall Agnol

See also
 Romania men's national volleyball team

References

External links
Official Website   
CEV profile 

Romanian volleyball clubs